Bentazon (Bentazone, Basagran, Herbatox, Leader, Laddock) is a chemical manufactured by BASF Chemicals for use in herbicides. It is categorized under the thiadiazine group of chemicals. Sodium bentazon is available commercially  and appears slightly brown in colour.

Usage
Bentazon is a selective herbicide as it only damages plants unable to metabolize the chemical. It is considered safe for use on alfalfa, beans (with the exception of garbanzo beans ), maize, peanuts, peas (with the exception of blackeyed peas ), pepper, peppermint, rice, sorghum, soybeans and spearmint; as well as lawns and turf. Bentazon is usually applied aerially or through contact spraying on food crops to control the spread of weeds occurring amongst food crops. Herbicides containing bentazon should be kept away from high heat as it will release toxic sulfur and nitrogen fumes.

Bentazon is currently registered for use in the United States in accordance with requirements set forth by the United States Environmental Protection Agency. However as of September 2010, the herbicides Basagran M60, Basagran DF, Basagran AG, Prompt 5L and Laddock 5L are currently under review for pending requests for voluntary registration cancellation.

Water and ground contamination
In general, bentazon is quickly metabolized and degraded by both plants and animals. However, soil leaching and runoff is a major concern in terms of water contamination. In 1995 the Environmental Protection Agency (EPA) stated that levels of bentazon in both ground water and surface water "exceed levels of concern". Despite the establishment of a 20 parts per billion Health Advisory Level there is no requirement to measure for bentazon in water supplies as the Safe Drinking Water Act does not regulate bentazon. The United States EPA found bentazon in 64 out of 200 wells in California - the highest number of detections in their 1995 study. This prompted the State of California to review existing toxicology studies and establish a "Public Health Goal" that limits bentazon in drinking water to 200 parts per billion.

The EPA requires ground water and environmental hazard advisory labels on all commercially available herbicides containing bentazon. Both statements warn against application and/or disposal of bentazon directly into water, or in areas where soil leaching is common.

Food contamination
A number of limits have been placed on bentazon to reduce the possibility of toxic effects on humans. Tolerance levels vary depending on the use of the food/animal product. The following tolerance levels for bentazon have been established in the United States:
 0.02 ppm for milk.
 0.05 ppm (parts per million) for meat and animal byproducts (poultry, eggs, cattle, hogs, sheep and goats).  
 0.05 ppm for dried beans (excluding soybeans), corn (fresh and grain), bohemian chili peppers, peanuts, rice, soybeans, and sorghum used for fodder and grain.
 0.5 ppm for succulent beans and peas.
 0.3 ppm for peanut hulls.
 1 ppm for mint and dried peas.
 3 ppm for rice (straw), corn for fodder and forage, and peanuts used in hay and forage.
 8 ppm for pea vine hays (dried), and soybeans used for foraging or hay.
It is recommended that food and feed supplies be stored away from herbicides containing bentazon. Aerial spraying should be conducted in a manner that prevents spray drift towards water sources and food crops susceptible to bentazon.

Toxicity to nonhuman species
A 1994 study concluded that bentazon is non-toxic to honeybees, and is not harmful to beetles. Studies have found that bentazon is toxic to rainbow trout and bluegill sunfish at 190 ppm and 616 ppm, respectively. Bentazon is considered toxic to birds as it affects their reproductive capacities.

Among mammals, bentazon is found to be moderately toxic when ingested or absorbed through the skin. Lethal doses (LD50, the dose required to kill half the population being studied) for bentazon have been established for:
 Cats: 500 mg/kg 
 Rats: 1100 mg/kg to 2063 mg/kg 
 Mice: 400 mg/kg  
 Rabbits: 750 mg/kg 
Dogs in a study being fed 13.1 mg of bentazon a day developed diarrhoea, anemia and dehydration. In another study using dogs, prostate inflammation was also observed along with previously noted health effects  
In experiments conducted on hamsters, mice and rats, bentazon was not found to cause gene mutations to damage to DNA and chromosomes.

Toxicity to humans
Bentazon has been classified by the EPA as a "Group E" chemical, because it is believed to be non-carcinogenic to humans (as based on testing conducted on animals). However, there are no studies or experiments that can determine toxic and/or carcinogenic effects of bentazon on humans. Workers applying the herbicide would be most exposed to bentazon, and so have been advised to wear protective clothing (goggles, gloves and aprons) at all times when handling the chemical. Bentazon causes allergy-like symptoms as it irritates the eyes, skin and respiratory tract. Ingesting bentazon causes nausea, diarrhoea, trembling, vomiting and difficulty breathing. Workers handling bentazon must wash their hands before eating, drinking, smoking, and using the bathroom to minimize contact with skin.
The effects of bentazon ingestion has been observed in humans who chose the herbicide to commit suicide. Ingestion of bentazon was observed to cause fevers, renal failure (kidney failure), accelerated heart rate (tachycardia), shortness of breath (dyspnea) and hyperthermia. Ingestion of 88 grams of bentazon caused death in an adult.

References

Herbicides
Benzothiadiazines
Isopropyl compounds
Sultams